Hana Vymazalová (born 1978), is a Czech Egyptologist. She graduated in Egyptology and Logic at the Faculty of Arts, Charles University in Prague.

Her dissertation focused on accounting texts from the archives of pharaoh Raneferef. Her interests include the economy of Old Kingdom funerary complexes and the use of mathematics in administration. She has been a member of the Abusir excavation team since 2006.

Publications include but are not limited to:
 Hana Vymazalová - Miroslav Bárta (eds.), Chronology and Archaeology in Ancient Egypt (The Third Millennium B.C.), Prague 2008.
 J. Krejčí, V.G. Callender, M. Verner, (with contributions by Viktor Černý, Eugen Strouhal, Hana Vymazalová and Martina Žaloudková-Kujanová), Abusir XII. Minor tombs in the Royal Necropolis I (The Mastabas of Nebtyemneferes and Nakhtsare, Pyramid Complex Lepsius no. 24 and Tomb Complex Lepsius no. 25), Prague 2008.
 Paule Posener–Kriéger – Miroslav Verner - Hana Vymazalová, Abusir X. The Pyramid Complex of Raneferef. The Papyrus Archive, Praha 2006.
 Vymazalová, Hana: Staroegyptská matematika. Hieratické matematické texty (Ancient Egyptian Mathematics. Hieratic Mathematical Texts); 1. vyd. 2006, Dějiny matematiky 31. Praha: Český egyptologický ústav; 150 s. . Anotace: Egyptské matematické texty psané hieratickým písmem. Překlad a komentář. (Ancient Egyptian mathematical texts written in hieratic. Translation and commentary.)

References

1978 births
Living people
Czech Egyptologists
Charles University alumni